Alexander González Laureano (born 18 May 1974) is a Puerto Rican boxer. He competed in the men's light heavyweight event at the 1992 Summer Olympics.

References

External links
 

1974 births
Living people
Puerto Rican male boxers
Olympic boxers of Puerto Rico
Boxers at the 1992 Summer Olympics
People from Vega Baja, Puerto Rico
Light-heavyweight boxers
20th-century Puerto Rican people